Liberty County is a county located in the U.S. state of Montana. As of the 2020 census, the population was 1,959. Its county seat is Chester. The decision to separate the future Liberty County area from the previous Hill and Chouteau counties was carried in a 1919 vote; the organization was authorized to commence in the following February.

The southwestern corner of Liberty County holds Tiber Dam, a popular tourist and recreation area.

Geography
Liberty County is on the state's north line, so that it shares the US border with Canada. It abuts the Canadian province of Alberta.

Adjacent counties

 Toole County – west
 Pondera County – southwest
 Chouteau County – south
 Hill County – east
 County of Forty Mile No. 8, Alberta – north

Politics

Demographics

2000 census
As of the 2000 census, of 2000, there were 2,158 people, 833 households, and 583 families living in the county. The population density was 2 people per square mile (1/km2). There were 1,070 housing units at an average density of 1 per square mile (0/km2). The racial makeup of the county was 99.21% White, 0.09% Native American, 0.32% Asian, 0.09% from other races, and 0.28% from two or more races.  0.19% of the population were Hispanic or Latino of any race. 39.0% were of German, 20.0% Norwegian, 7.2% English, 5.8% American and 5.0% Irish ancestry. 84.5% spoke English and 15.5% German as their first language.

There were 833 households, out of which 30.40% had children under the age of 18 living with them, 62.70% were married couples living together, 5.60% had a female householder with no husband present, and 29.90% were non-families. 27.90% of all households were made up of individuals, and 14.00% had someone living alone who was 65 years of age or older. The average household size was 2.51 and the average family size was 3.11.

The county population contained 25.80% under the age of 18, 5.80% from 18 to 24, 24.70% from 25 to 44, 24.10% from 45 to 64, and 19.70% who were 65 years of age or older. The median age was 42 years. For every 100 females there were 97.10 males. For every 100 females age 18 and over, there were 93.60 males.

The median income for a household in the county was $30,284, and the median income for a family was $37,361. Males had a median income of $23,158 versus $16,579 for females. The per capita income for the county was $14,882. About 19.00% of families and 20.30% of the population were below the poverty line, including 28.90% of those under age 18 and 15.50% of those age 65 or over.

Researchers William P. O'Hare and Kenneth M. Johnson described the county as typical of the northern Great Plains in being very thinly settled, almost fully dependent on agriculture, and lacking in urban areas. They noted that income can fluctuate substantially from year to year, depending on rainfall (which affects harvest yields) as well as grain and cattle prices, and that the 2000 Census recorded low incomes in 1999 after several years of drought. Also, the presence of Hutterite colonies in the county depresses per capita incomes because Hutterite families have significantly more children than the general population.

2010 census
As of the 2010 census, there were 2,339 people, 822 households, and 537 families living in the county. The racial makeup of the county was 98.2% white, 0.2% American Indian, 0.1% black or African American, 0.1% Asian, 0.2% from other races, and 1.2% from two or more races. Those of Hispanic or Latino origin made up 0.3% of the population. In terms of ancestry, 55.4% were German, 24.1% were Norwegian, 14.5% were Irish, 9.9% were English, and 1.4% were American.

Of the 822 households, 23.7% had children under the age of 18 living with them, 59.5% were married couples living together, 4.7% had a female householder with no husband present, 34.7% were non-families, and 32.2% of all households were made up of individuals. The average household size was 2.36 and the average family size was 3.00. The median age was 44.6 years.

The median income for a household in the county was $40,212 and the median income for a family was $44,957. Males had a median income of $35,788 versus $30,714 for females. The per capita income for the county was $19,097. About 12.4% of families and 19.5% of the population were below the poverty line, including 31.6% of those under age 18 and 15.6% of those age 65 or over.

Communities

Town
 Chester (county seat)

Census-designated places

 Eagle Creek Colony
 Joplin
 Riverview Colony
 Sage Creek Colony
 Whitlash

Other unincorporated communities

 Hill
 Lothair
 Tiber

See also
 List of lakes in Liberty County, Montana
 List of mountains in Liberty County, Montana
 National Register of Historic Places listings in Liberty County MT

References

 
1919 establishments in Montana
Populated places established in 1919